Kristina Joder (born July 11, 1978) is an American cross-country skier. She competed in two events at the 2002 Winter Olympics.

Cross-country skiing results
All results are sourced from the International Ski Federation (FIS).

Olympic Games

World Cup

Season standings

References

External links
 

1978 births
Living people
American female cross-country skiers
Olympic cross-country skiers of the United States
Cross-country skiers at the 2002 Winter Olympics
People from Springfield, Vermont
Sportspeople from Vermont
21st-century American women